Alfie Malik Whiteman (born 2 October 1998) is an English professional footballer who plays as a goalkeeper for Tottenham Hotspur.

Career
Whiteman joined the Tottenham academy in 2015. In 2019, he signed a new contract with the club until 2022.

On 26 November 2020, Whiteman was brought on as a substitute against Ludogorets Razgrad in the UEFA Europa League in the 82nd minute, replacing Joe Hart.

On 12 August 2021, Whiteman joined Swedish Allsvenskan side Degerfors on loan for the rest of the Swedish 2021 season.  He returned to Tottenham after the Swedish season finished in December 2021.  Whiteman began a second loan with Degerfors in February 2022, and returned to Tottenham in December 2022.

On 22 February 2023, it was announced that Alfie had signed a new contract with Tottenham until 2025.

Personal life
Whiteman attended Park View School in Tottenham.

Career statistics

References

External links
 Profile at the Tottenham Hotspur F.C. website

1998 births
Living people
Footballers from Tottenham
English footballers
Association football goalkeepers
Tottenham Hotspur F.C. players
England youth international footballers
English expatriate footballers
English expatriate sportspeople in Sweden
Expatriate footballers in Sweden
Degerfors IF players